Forest Highways or Forest Routes are a category of roads within United States National Forests. They are built to connect the national forests to the existing state highway systems, and to provide improved access to recreational and logging areas.

Description
United States federal law defines the term Forest Highway as "a forest road under the jurisdiction of, and maintained by, a public authority and open to public travel." Forest highways are designated by the United States Forest Service and funded by the federal government, but are generally owned and maintained by the states or counties in which they are located. Forest highways are usually marked with markers in the shape of an isosceles trapezoid, wider at the top and narrower at the base. The shields are brown with a white border and divided by a horizontal white line. In the majority of the space (above the line), the number of the route appears in white Highway Gothic numbers, while in the smaller space below the line is written "National Forest" in the cursive Forest Service logotype used to write "National Forest" on national forest gateway signs. To qualify for inclusion in the system, a roadway must "be wholly or partially within, or adjacent to, and serving the National Forest System" among other criteria.

History
In the 1920s, forest highway was a class of federal aid, and could be used outside forests, as long as the projects improved access to the forests.

Gallery

See also 
 Forest road

References

External links

 Forest Highways  at Federal Lands Highway Division
 Forest Routes at California Highways

 
Highways
Types of roads